KTD or ktd may refer to:

Kai Tak Development, the redevelopment of the site of the former Kai Tak Airport in Kai Tak, Kowloon, Hong Kong
Kwun Tong District, a district of Kowloon, Hong Kong
KTD, the IATA airport code for Kitadaito Airport, Okinawa, Japan
KTD, the Indian Railways station code for Kantadih railway station, West Bengal, India
ktd, the ISO 639-3 code for the Kukarta language in Australia